The Savolax Infantry Regiment was an infantry musketeer regiment in the Swedish Army, in the province of Savolax (Savonia). The regiment was created in 1626 as the Savolax and Nyslotts Land Regiment. It was allotted regiment in 1695. The regiment contained musketeer and grenadier units.

History
The Savolax Infantry Regiment was created in 1626 as the Savolax and Nyslotts Land Regiment. (Swedish: Savolax regemente) It was created as part of the Swedish Allotment System. In 1634, Savolax Regiment was ranked 14th amongst the Swedish infantry regiments by a Swedish government regulation. The regiment's origins go back to the Gustav Horn's regiment.

Uniform

Troopers were armed with a bayonet and a musket, the bayonet was fixed to the musket at all times. Non - Commissioned Officers carried halberds and wore almost identical uniforms to regular infantry, with some differences. These were: 

Silver lacing on the tricorne.
Brass buttons instead of tin buttons.

References

Infantry regiments of Sweden
Military units and formations established in the 1620s
Military history of Finland
Savonia (historical province)